The 2015–16 All-Ireland Senior Club Hurling Championship was the 46th staging of the All-Ireland Senior Club Hurling Championship since it began in the 1970-71 season. It is the Gaelic Athletic Association's premier inter-county club hurling tournament. The winners receive the Tommy Moore Cup.

The championship began on 4 October 2015 and ended on 17 March 2016.

Ballyhale Shamrocks were the defending champions but were defeated by O'Loughlin Gaels in the Kilkenny championship. Cuala, Glen Rovers and Sarsfields returned to the championship after prolonged absences.

On 17 March 2016, Na Piarsaigh won the championship following a 2-25 to 2-14 defeat of Ruairí Óg, Cushendall in the All-Ireland final. This was their first All-Ireland title and a first title for a Limerick club.

Ruairí Óg, Cushendall's Neil McManus was the championship's top scorer with 2-29.

Format

County Championships

Ireland's counties play their county championships between their senior hurling clubs. Each county decides the format for determining their county champions. The format can be knockout, double-elimination, league, etc or a combination.

Provincial Championships

Leinster, Munster and Ulster organise a provincial championship for their participating county champions. Connacht do not organise a provincial championship and are represented in the All-Ireland semi-finals by the Galway champions. All matches are knock-out and extra time is played if it's a draw at the end of normal time.

All-Ireland

The two semi-finals are played in early February. The All-Ireland final is traditionally played in Croke Park on St. Patrick's Day, the 17th of March. All matches are knock-out. If it's a draw at the end of normal time in the semi-finals, extra time is played. If the final ends in a draw the match is replayed.

Initial Schedule

County championships April 2015 to November 2015
Provincial championships October 2015 to December 2015
All-Ireland semi-finals early February 2016
All-Ireland final 17 March 2016

Provincial championships

Leinster Senior Club Hurling Championship

Quarter-finals

Semi-finals

Final

Munster Senior Club Hurling Championship

Quarter-final

Semi-finals

Final

Ulster Senior Club Hurling Championship

Quarter-final

Semi-finals

Final

All-Ireland Senior Club Hurling Championship

All-Ireland Draw

All-Ireland Semi-Finals

All-Ireland final

Top scorers

Overall

Single game

Miscellaneous

After losing six provincial finals between 1994 and 2013, Oulart–The Ballagh finally won the Leinster title by defeating Cuala 2-13 to 0-13.

Team Summaries

References

2015 in hurling
2016 in hurling
All-Ireland Senior Club Hurling Championship